Cambourne is a new settlement and civil parish in Cambridgeshire, England, in the district of South Cambridgeshire. It lies on the A428 road between Cambridge, 9 miles (14 km) to the east, and St Neots and Bedford to the west. It comprises the three villages of Great Cambourne, Lower Cambourne and Upper Cambourne. The area is close to Bourn Airfield.

Cambourne is the largest settlement in South Cambridgeshire, with a population of  8,186 in the 2011 UK census. Continued house building and a high birthrate contribute to continued population increase, which was estimated at 10,544 in 2020.

History 

As part of plans to build thousands of new homes in the south-east of England, a new settlement on 400 hectares of former agricultural land, nine miles west of Cambridge, was considered in the late 1980s. In 1994, the Section 106 agreement from the Town and Country Planning Act 1990 was completed by the developers (McA), the local authority, Cambridgeshire County Council and the developers together with the landholders. The new settlement was to be constructed by three of Britain's larger  builders of housing developments, Bovis Homes, Bryant Homes and Taylor Wimpey. Planning permission for the development at Monkfield Park was given in November 1996, and construction began in June 1998, on what was previously farmland.

In 2008, work began on building Upper Cambourne, with an original estimated completion date of 2012. The existing planning permission allowed 3,300 homes in the development. On 3 October 2011, planning permission was granted for a further 950 homes. This was set to take building work up to approximately 2016, and complete Upper Cambourne. In January 2017 outline planning consent was granted for a further 2,350 homes to the west of Lower Cambourne.

Cambourne was initially going to be named Monkfield after the name of the original farm, which is commemorated by a Monkfield Lane in Great Cambourne and the village pub, The Monkfield Arms. However, the name of the community was eventually created from the names of Cambridge, the nearest city, and Bourn, a nearby village.

The South Cambridgeshire (Parishes) Order 2004 created the new civil parish of Cambourne from 1 April 2004 and changed the boundaries of the Bourn parish.

Amenities 

Some facilities were built in Cambourne as part of the initial development. These included a Morrisons supermarket and petrol station, a medical practice, a dentist, a veterinary practice, allotments, a pub, The Monkfield Arms, owned by Pathfinder Pubs and a hotel, The Cambridge Belfry, run by DoubleTree by Hilton.

The High Street in Cambourne has been developed further with a fish and chip shop, Domino's pizza shop, several estate agents, a Ladbrokes bookmaker, a Cambridge Building Society branch, a dry cleaner, a coffee shop, a Chinese takeaway, an Indian restaurant and a Lloyds Pharmacy. An initial summary of future plans for the High Street development was presented by Newcrest Developments at a Parish Council planning meeting on 24 January 2012. This suggested that a three-stage process could begin at the end of 2014, with a couple of larger retail units being built beside the Morrisons roundabout. Stage 2 could see a row of smaller shops and a larger convenience store located on land opposite The Monkfield Arms. The final stage could see a couple of medium-sized stores positioned on the barren land beside the medical practice. In April 2014, a planning application was submitted for a new 60-bedroom hotel, pub and small shop unit on open land at the entrance to Great Cambourne.
In 2008, the local Police force Cambridgeshire Constabulary announced the building of a new police station in the village, complementing the two other rural stations in Histon and Sawston, and two outposts at Melbourn and Linton, in South Cambridgeshire. It was planned to be ready by December 2009 but, due to various delays, it partially opened in July 2010. Cambourne Police Station 
fully opened in September 2010.

In May 2011, Cambourne Fire Station
was completed on Back Lane, adjacent to the police station. There will however be no serving firefighters or fire engine until the Papworth Everard fire station is deemed no longer necessary. In June 2011, Cambridgeshire Fire and Rescue Service district staff for Cambridge City and South Cambridgeshire (managers, administrators, fire protection officers and community safety officers) moved into Cambourne Fire Station while the Parkside Fire Station in Cambridge is being redeveloped. In March 2012, Cambridgeshire Fire and Rescue Service relocated their High Volume Pump and Hose Layer Unit from Huntingdon to the Cambourne Fire Station. Retained firefighters from the nearby Papworth and Gamlingay stations are trained to use these vehicles as part of the UK's New Dimension programme.

Cambourne Business Park is located to the north east of Great Cambourne and is the home of South Cambridgeshire District Council, which relocated there in 2004. Environmental facilities include an educational eco park, which is home to a variety of plant, bird and mammal life, and a Country Park covering , partially opened in 2001, situated between Lower Cambourne and Great Cambourne.

Sport 
Various sports clubs are located in the villages, including football, rugby, tennis, netball and cricket clubs with their own pitches.

Cambourne Cricket Club was formed in 2003 by Jason Clatworthy and Paul Cooke, but did not begin playing competitive cricket until 2006 due to delays to the delivery and maturity of playing facilities. The club has enjoyed a sustained period of growth since its inception, culminating in the award of ECB Clubmark status in 2008, which demonstrates proven higher levels of organisation, management, coaching and safety.  The club has three adult teams playing in the Saturday CCA leagues and three Colts teams playing in the CYCA leagues. Building work on a new pavilion in Lower Cambourne was completed in April 2007 and a second ground in Great Cambourne opened in August 2009 behind the church which allowed the club to enter a 3rd adult team into the league and presents further opportunity for growth.

The senior football club is Cambourne Rovers FC, whose Saturday side plays in the Cambridgeshire Football League BIS Division 1a. A reserve team also plays. CRFC is further represented by a Sunday league team, competing in the Halls of Cambridge Sunday League Division 4B.

The largest junior football club is called Cambourne FC, with a Soccer School for U6, an U7 team in playing in the Hunts Mini League, an U8 team, an U9 team, two U10 teams, and two U11 teams playing in the Cambs Mini League. The club also has an U12 and an U13 team playing in the Cambs Colts league.

Cambourne Exiles Rugby Club was formed in 2005 when some of the villagers decided to form a rugby-related social group. The first game was on 26 November 2005, against Saffron Walden 3. The team have grown to be a competent threes-level team. After the first season of friendly matches, in 2006 the team joined the Greene King Merit League.

A new sports pavilion was completed in September 2011 on the playing fields off Back Lane, Greater Cambourne. This has multi-changing facilities for the Football and Rugby pitches and a maintenance shed for the Parish Council. In November 2011, the second-floor bar was opened as Cambourne Sports and Social Club.

Cambourne Fitness and Sports Centre was officially opened on 4 December 2011 on Back Lane, Great Cambourne by England international footballer Darren Bent, Great British gymnast Beth Tweddle and Great British Paralympic swimmer Harriet Lee. Costing around £2 million it has a large sports hall, dance studio, juice bar and large gym. It is run by leisure firm Everyone Active with a profits share going to Cambourne Parish Council.

Transport 
The transport network for the area has been developed further as a result of Cambourne's construction, with the extension of the dual-carriageway section of the A428. This new bypass opened in May 2007 and has moved much traffic from the single carriageway into Cambridge onto the new road. The route does not have a separate cycle lane, even though Cambridge has the highest levels of cycling in the UK, and South Cambridgeshire has the third highest cycling levels.

A bus service operates between Cambourne and Cambridge, with less-frequent services towards St Neots, Huntingdon and St Ives.

, the nearest railway station is located at St Neots. This project has seen a funding of £5 Billion from the Government. 

Mid 2020 the 'Cambourne West Consortium' gained consent to create a new bus-only roadway to connect Sterling Way in Upper Cambourne and Broadway, to substantially decrease the overall distance travelled by local bus services. (the majority of services travel along St Neots Road,  entering and leaving Cambourne via Cambourne Road.) The new bus gate would allow services such as the Stagecoach Citi 4 route to extend from School Lane to the new roundabout junction on the A1198, and then into Cambourne West. ECL Civil Engineering was appointed as the Principal Contractor to deliver the first phase of the Cambourne West Project infrastructure.

Religion

Christianity
From an early point in planning the new development of Cambourne, Christian church leaders expressed an interest in being involved in helping create the new community.  The original Cambourne master plan included space for a church located at the east end of the High Street. This ultimately resulted in the Church of England, the Baptist Union of Great Britain, the Methodist Church of Great Britain, and the United Reformed Church working together to form the Local Ecumenical Partnership called Cambourne Church.
In late 1999, as the first homes became occupied, the church was already open. The first full-time residential minister was appointed in early 2001.  The waiting room of the doctor's surgery (now the dentist's) became the first meeting place. Before funds to build the permanent Church Centre were raised, an old Portakabin classroom was reconditioned by local residents and placed on the corner of Eastgate and Jeavons Lane opposite the planned Church site. It became the first community building available for Cambourne residents, opening as The Ark in 2002. This quickly became home to a wide variety of community groups.

Phase one of building was completed at a cost of £1.1 million in late 2009 and officially opened by the Duke of Gloucester on 13 July 2010. The building has a tall, barn-like design, aiming to be accessible, welcoming and environmentally sustainable. The main hall accommodates up to 150 worshipers, as well as providing space for public and private events. In October 2019 the Annexe was opened offering a further space for worship, church groups and community events. As well as the Cambourne Church congregation, the Roman Catholic congregation also regularly meets in the church centre.

An Independent Baptist church Peacehaven Baptist Church, was started in 2006 and meets at the Cambourne Community Centre (The Hub). Christ Church Cambourne, a free evangelical church, meets at Cambourne Village College.

Hinduism
After Christianity, Hinduism is the second most numerous religion recorded.

Schools 
Cambourne has a very high birth rate compared to many other places in the South Cambridgeshire area. Four primary schools and a secondary school have been built in the area, to ensure that pupils do not have to take buses to schools in Hardwick and other villages in the local area. The first of the schools to be built was Monkfield Park Primary School in Great Cambourne, followed by The Vine Inter-Church School in Upper Cambourne and a temporary Jeavons Wood Primary School in Great Cambourne. On 21 June 2011, work began on a new permanent building for the Jeavons Wood Primary School, situated 100 yards from the temporary site on Eastgate, Great Cambourne. When the Jeavons Wood School vacated the temporary buildings, it re-opened as a fourth primary school, which was operated as a second campus of Hardwick and Cambourne Community Primary School. This school relocated to a permanent campus on Sheepfold Lane in September 2015.

On 29 June 2011, Cambridgeshire County Council held a public exhibition of the plans for 'A Secondary School for Cambourne'. On 27 January 2012, Councillors at Cambridgeshire County Council's development control committee meeting, approved these plans. Cambourne Village College opened in September 2013 in the north-west of Lower Cambourne. Previously, primary schools in the area were in the catchment for Comberton Village College. A coach also transports several children in the village to and from St Bede's Inter-Church School in Cambridge.

Youth Work 
Cambourne has a large population of young people, due in part to the very high birth rate over a number of years, but also as a result of families moving into the town. In Cambourne's early years, Cambourne Youth Partnership was set up as a charity to bring together those working with young people across the town. Cambourne Youth Partnership operates out of Cambourne Soul, a youth centre facility in Great Cambourne, and currently partners with Romsey Mill to provide both universal and targeted youth services.

Art, hobbies and culture 
Cambourne has several art, hobbyist and cultural clubs and societies. Many of these which cater to specific interests of the community, such as painting, music, photography, gardening, etc. while others are broader in nature.

Cambourne Community Website 
The main objective of this website is to provide local information to the residents of Cambourne in South Cambridgeshire. It will contain the latest news deemed relevant to the community. Be a “one stop shop” for Cambourne residents to find all the community information they need to participate in community life publicise local events. Answer the “How do I?”; “Where do I?”; and “How can I?” type questions as relevant to the locality and the community

Cambourne Cultural Society
CCS was set up in 2010 with the vision of creating a platform for celebrating the culture, music and dance of the diaspora from the Indian subcontinent. It has now grown to over 100 members, with membership open to anyone who has an interest in the culture and arts of the sub-continent. The society members hold frequent gatherings, mostly for celebrating Indian festivals like Diwali, Navratri, etc, and featuring dance, music and food from the subcontinent.

Cambourne Retro Video Game Night
The Cambourne Retro Video Game Night celebrates the history of video games in a social event.

Cambourne Crescent 
Cambourne Crescent is a local charitable trust established in 2011. The charity works along with the wider community to help Cambridge food bank, Jimmy's Charity, Art and Minds Charity and local schools. It also runs a Science and Technology Club.

Geography

References

External links 

 Cambourne Forums
 Cambourne website
 Cambourne Parish Council
 Cambourne Church
Cambourne Crescent
Cambourne Soul

 
Civil parishes in Cambridgeshire
Populated places established in 1998
Villages in Cambridgeshire
New towns in England
South Cambridgeshire District
New towns started in the 1980s